The Men's 200 metre freestyle competition of the 2018 European Aquatics Championships was held on 6 and 7 August 2018.

Records
Prior to the competition, the existing world and championship records were as follows.

Results

Heats
The heats were started on 6 August at 09:30.

Semifinals
The semifinals were started on 6 August at 17:21.

Semifinal 1

Semifinal 2

Final
The final was started on 7 August at 17:18.

References

Men's 200 metre freestyle